"Daddy's Money" is a song recorded by American country music group Ricochet. It was released in April 1996 as the second single from their self-titled debut album. The song reached Number One on the Billboard Hot Country Singles & Tracks chart in July 1996. The song was written by Bob DiPiero, Mark D. Sanders, and Steve Seskin.

Critical reception
In a review of the band's career, Billboard magazine called the song an "infectious uptempo romp."

Music video
This was their first music video, and it was directed by Marc Ball. It premiered on CMT on April 24, 1996 during The CMT Delivery Room. A portion of their debut single "What Do I Know" is played at the beginning of the video.

Chart performance
"Daddy's Money" debuted at number 63 on the U.S. Billboard Hot Country Singles & Tracks for the week of April 27, 1996.

Year-end charts

References

1996 singles
Ricochet (band) songs
Songs written by Bob DiPiero
Songs written by Steve Seskin
Songs written by Mark D. Sanders
Song recordings produced by Ron Chancey
Columbia Records singles
1996 songs